Inge Eckel (7 October 1932 – 23 July 2003) was a German sprinter. She competed in the women's 4 × 100 metres relay at the 1952 Summer Olympics representing Saar.

See also
 Saar at the 1952 Summer Olympics

References

External links
 

1932 births
2003 deaths
Athletes (track and field) at the 1952 Summer Olympics
German female sprinters
Olympic athletes of Saar
Place of birth missing
Saar athletes
Olympic female sprinters